The 2015 Virginia Tech Hokies football team represented the Virginia Tech in the 2015 NCAA Division I FBS football season. The Hokies were led by 29th-year head coach Frank Beamer, who retired following the conclusion of the season and play their home games at Lane Stadium in Blacksburg, Virginia. They are members of the Coastal Division of the Atlantic Coast Conference. They finished the season 7–6, 4–4 in ACC play to finish in a tie for fourth in the Coastal Division. They were invited to the Independence Bowl where they defeated Tulsa.

On November 1, Beamer announced he would retire at the end of the season. He finished at Virginia Tech with a 29-year record of 238–121–2.

Schedule

Schedule Source:

Game summaries

Ohio State

Furman

at Purdue

East Carolina

Pittsburgh

NC State

at Miami (FL)

Duke

at Boston College

at Georgia Tech

North Carolina

at Virginia

vs. Tulsa

References

External links

Virginia Tech
Virginia Tech Hokies football seasons
Independence Bowl champion seasons
Virginia Tech Hokies football